Nevatim Israeli Air Force Base , also Air Force Base 28, is an Israeli Air Force base located southeast of Be'er Sheva, near moshav Nevatim. It was built as a rough runway in 1947 for the Sherut Avir, the air wing of the Haganah, and was named Malhata after the archaeological site on which it was partly built. It was reopened in 1983 as a new modern airbase with two runways as the result of joint Israeli and US government funding as part of the IAF's redeployment out of its bases in the Sinai after it was returned to Egypt following the Camp David Accords. Since 2003 the base has gradually received more squadrons of F-16s. A third runway was built in the mid-2000s decade as part of a project to accommodate the transfer of military activities previously taking place at Ben Gurion Airport (Air Force Base 27) to Nevatim.

Israel's growing fleet of Lockheed Martin F-35Is are currently based in Nevatim. All F-16s have been deactivated.

Units
 103 Squadron "Elephants" – operating the C-130J
 116 Squadron "Lions Of The South" – operating the F-35I
 117 Squadron "First Jet" – operating the F-35I for pilot training
 120 Squadron "Desert Giants" – operating the Boeing 707 as a flying tanker
 122 Squadron "Nachshon" – operating the Gulfstream G550 as an AWACS/CAEW plane
 131 Squadron "Yellow Bird Knights" – operating the C-130E/H
 140 Squadron "Golden Eagle" – operating the F-35I

References

External links

Nevatim from globalsecurity.org
Aeroflight World Airforces

Military units and formations established in 1947
Israeli Air Force bases